UGC 2140 is an irregular galaxy in the constellation Aries. It was thought to be a compact group of galaxies, catalogued as HCG 18, but in 1999 the object was found to be a single galaxy with multiple star-forming regions.

References

Aries (constellation)
02140
258